The 1920 TCU Horned Frogs football team represented Texas Christian University (TCU) as a member of the Texas Intercollegiate Athletic Association (TIAA) during the 1920 college football season. Led by first-year head coach William L. Driver, the Frogs compiled an overall record of 9–1 with a conference mark of 3–0, winning the TIAA title. TCU hosted Centre on New Year's Day in the Fort Worth Classic, losing by a score of 63 to 7. The team's captain was Astyanax Douglass, who played center.

Schedule

References

TCU
TCU Horned Frogs football seasons
TCU Horned Frogs football